Pašiliai ('place by pinewood', formerly) is a village in Kėdainiai district municipality, in Kaunas County, in central Lithuania. According to the 2011 census, the village had a population of 197 people.

Pašiliai is a collective gardening area (gardening cooperatives "Vasara", "Kooperatyvas", "Pašilė", "Kristalas", "Obelėlė", "Kosmosas", "Progresas" are located here). There is a former cemetery place, a former folwark building with relics of a park.

History
In the beginning of the 20th century there was Pašiliai (Podborek) estate and folwark. During the Soviet era it was transformed into Kėdainiai collective gardening area.

Demography

Images

References

Villages in Kaunas County
Kėdainiai District Municipality